Carlos Mariano Molina Pino (born 23 October 1969) is a Chilean former professional footballer who played as a midfielder for clubs in Colombia and Venezuela.

Career
As a youth player, Molina was with Escuela Carlos Sarmiento and Deportivo Cali before moving Cúcuta Deportivo. In 1991, he played for Independiente Santa Fe, coinciding with his compatriot Juan Ramón Garrido, becoming the first Chileans to play for the club before Luis Ceballos, Mauricio Illesca and Julio Gutiérrez, returning to Deportivo Cali in the same year.

After a brief stint with Venezuelan side Universidad de Los Andes, he went on his career in Colombia playing for Deportes Quindío, Atlético Huila, Cortuluá and América de Cali.

A historical player of Cortuluá, where he coincided with his compatriot Elías Escalona some seasons, he took part in the 2002 Copa Libertadores after the team led the Torneo Apertura 2001.

As a player of América de Cali, he suffered a serious crisis after an arthroscopy.

Following his retirement, he worked for many years at the América de Cali youth ranks, and has after coached clubs such as Deportivo El Padrino from Cali.

Personal life
Born in Santiago, Chile, Molina moved to Colombia at the age of two. All his family is Chilean and his father was a merchant ship captain.

Due to his origin, he is popularly known as El Chileno Molina (The Chilean Molina).

He has a close friendship with the coach Reinaldo Rueda, who coached him in Cortuluá.

References

External links
 
 

1969 births
Living people
Footballers from Santiago
Chilean footballers
Chilean expatriate footballers
Cúcuta Deportivo footballers
Independiente Santa Fe footballers
Deportivo Cali footballers
Deportes Quindío footballers 
Atlético Huila footballers
Cortuluá footballers
América de Cali footballers
Categoría Primera A players
Venezuelan Primera División players
Association football midfielders
Chilean expatriate sportspeople in Colombia
Expatriate footballers in Colombia
Chilean expatriate sportspeople in Venezuela
Expatriate footballers in Venezuela
Chilean emigrants to Colombia
Chilean football managers
Chilean expatriate football managers
Expatriate football managers in Colombia